Hockey Talks is an initiative with in the National Hockey League raising awareness of mental health issues. It was started by the Vancouver Canucks, after the death of Forward Rick Rypien. The first year of Hockey Talks was held in 2013 and included seven Canadian NHL teams participating in the initiative. Currently 18 NHL clubs participate, hosting one home game in February to dedicating to sharing resources, and breaking the stigma around mental health.

References

National Hockey League